The Tucson Desert Harmony Chorus is an all-female, a cappella chorus based in Tucson, Arizona.

History
Founded in 1986 as the Tucson Goodtime Singers, the Tucson Desert Harmony Chorus Chorus is an a cappella chorus in Golden West Region 21.  Singing music primarily in the barbershop style, they are affiliated with Sweet Adelines International (SAI), the world's largest all-female singing organization with over 25,000 members worldwide.

Contest Placement
Harmony Classic 2nd place: 2014 International Baltimore, MD

Directors
The Tucson Desert Harmony Chorus is co-directed by Dayle Ann Kerrigan and Karen Jo Meade.

External links 
 Tucson Desert Harmony Chorus
 Golden West Region 21
 Sweet Adelines International

References 

A cappella musical groups
American choirs
Sweet Adelines International
Musical groups established in 1986
Women's musical groups
Women in Arizona